Urtica is a genus of flowering plants in the family Urticaceae. Many species have stinging hairs and may be called nettles or stinging nettles, although the latter name applies particularly to Urtica dioica.

Urtica species are food for the caterpillars of numerous Lepidoptera (butterflies and moths), such as the tortrix moth Syricoris lacunana and several Nymphalidae, such as Vanessa atalanta, one of the red admiral butterflies.

The generic name Urtica derives from the Latin for sting.

Description
Urtica species grow as annuals or perennial herbaceous plants, rarely shrubs. The perennial species have underground rhizomes. The green parts have stinging hairs. Their often quadrangular stems are unbranched or branched, erect, ascending or spreading.

Most leaves and stalks are arranged across opposite sides of the stem. The leaf blades are elliptic, lanceolate, ovate or circular. The leaf blades usually have three to five, rarely up to seven veins. The leaf margin is usually serrate to more or less coarsely toothed. The often-lasting bracts are free or fused to each other. The cystoliths are extended to more or less rounded.

In 1874, while in Collioure (south of France), French botanist Charles Naudin discovered that strong winds during 24 hours made the stinging hairs of Urtica harmless for a whole week.

Evolution 
The last common ancestor of the genus originated in Eurasia, with fossils being known from the Miocene of Germany and Russia, subsequently dispersing worldwide. Several species of the genus have undergone long distance oceanic dispersal, such as Hesperocnide sandwicensis (native to Hawaii) and Urtica ferox (native to New Zealand).

Species

A large number of species included within the genus in the older literature are now recognized as synonyms of Urtica dioica. Some of these taxa are still recognized as subspecies. Genetic evidence indicates that the two species of Hesperocnide are part of this genus.

Species in the genus Urtica, and their primary natural ranges, include:
Urtica andicola Webb
Urtica angustifolia Fisch. ex Hornem. China, Japan, Korea
Urtica ardens LinkChina
Urtica aspera Petrie South Island, New Zealand
Urtica atrichocaulis (Hand.-Mazz.) C.J.Chen Himalaya, southwestern China
Urtica atrovirens Req. ex Loisel. western Mediterranean region
Urtica australis Hook.f. South Island, New Zealand and surrounding subantarctic islands
Urtica cannabina L., Western Asia from Siberia to Iran
Urtica chamaedryoides Pursh (heartleaf nettle), southeastern North America
Urtica dioica L. (stinging nettle or bull nettle), Europe, Asia, North America
Urtica dioica subsp. galeopsifolia Wierzb. ex Opiz (fen nettle or stingless nettle), Europe. (Sometimes treated as a separate species Urtica galeopsifolia.)
Urtica dubia – illegitimate synonym of U. membranacea
Urtica ferox G.Forst. (ongaonga or tree nettle), New Zealand
Urtica fissa E.Pritz. China
Urtica gracilenta Greene (mountain nettle), Arizona, New Mexico, west Texas, northern Mexico
Urtica hyperborea Jacquem. ex Wedd. Himalaya from Pakistan to Bhutan, Mongolia and Tibet, high altitudes
Urtica incisa Poir. (scrub nettle), Australia, New Zealand
Urtica kioviensis Rogow. eastern Europe
Urtica laetivirens Maxim. Japan, Northeast China
Urtica lalibertadensis Weigend
Urtica linearifolia (Hook.f.) Cockayne (creeping or swamp nettle), or Urtica perconfusa, an at risk endemic climber, New Zealand
Urtica mairei H.Lév. Himalaya, southwestern China, northeastern India, Myanmar
Urtica massaica Mildbr. Africa
Urtica membranacea Poir. ex Savigny Mediterranean region, Azores and Madeira
Urtica morifolia Poir. Macaronesia
Urtica minutifolia Griseb. Bolivia
Urtica parviflora Himalaya (lower altitudes)
Urtica peruviana D.Getltman Perú
Urtica pseudomagellanica D.Geltman Bolivia
Urtica pilulifera L. (Roman nettle), southern Europe
Urtica platyphylla Wedd. Kamchatka, Sakhalin, Japan
Urtica procera Mühlenberg (tall nettle), North America
Urtica pubescens Ledeb. Southwestern Russia east to central Asia
Urtica rupestris Guss. Sicily (endemic)
Urtica sondenii (Simmons) Avrorin ex Geltman northeastern Europe, northern Asia
Urtica taiwaniana S.S.Ying Taiwan
Urtica thunbergiana Siebold & Zucc. Japan, Taiwan
Urtica triangularis Hand.-Mazz.
Urtica urens L. (small nettle or annual nettle), Europe, North America
Urtica urentivelutina Weigend

Ecology

Due to the stinging hairs, Urtica species are rarely eaten by herbivores, but rather provide shelter for insects, such as aphids, butterfly larvae, and moths.

Uses
Fabric woven of nettle fiber was found in burial sites in Denmark dating to the Bronze Age, and in clothing fabric, sailcloth, fishing nets, and paper via the process called retting (microbial enzymatic degradation, similar to linen processing). Other processing methods include mechanical and chemical.

In New Zealand, U. ferox is classified among poisonous plants, most commonly upon skin contact.

Urtica, called krapiva in Russian, kopriva in Macedonian, Croatian, Serbian, Bulgarian and Slovenian, and urzica in Romanian, is an ingredient in soups, omelettes, banitsa, purée, and other dishes. In Mazandaran, northern Iran, a soup (Āsh) is made using this plant. Nettles were used in traditional practices to make nettle tea, juice, and ale, and to preserve cheeses, such as in Cornish Yarg.

In folklore
Nettles have many folklore traditions associated with them.  The folklore mainly relates to the stinging nettle (Urtica dioica).

Literature

Asian
Milarepa, the great Tibetan ascetic and saint, was reputed to have survived his decades of solitary meditation by subsisting on nothing but nettles; his hair and skin turned green and he lived to the age of 83.

Caribbean
The Caribbean trickster figure Anansi appears in a story about nettles, in which he has to chop down a huge nettle patch in order to win the hand of the king's daughter.

European
An old Scots rhyme about the nettle:

"Gin ye be for lang kail coo the nettle, stoo the nettle
Gin ye be for lang kail coo the nettle early
Coo it laich, coo it sune, coo it in the month o' June
Stoo it ere it's in the bloom, coo the nettle early
Coo it by the auld wa's, coo it where the sun ne'er fa's
Stoo it when the day daws, coo the nettle early."
(Old Wives Lore for Gardeners, M & B Boland)

Coo, cow, and stoo are all Scottish for cut back or crop (although, curiously, another meaning of "stoo" is to throb or ache), while "laich" means short or low to the ground.  Given the repetition of "early," presumably this is advice to harvest nettles first thing in the morning and to cut them back hard [which seems to contradict the advice of the Royal Horticultural Society].

A well-known English rhyme about the stinging nettle is:
Tender-handed, stroke a nettle,
And it stings you for your pains.
Grasp it like a man of mettle,
And it soft as silk remains.

In Hans Christian Andersen's fairy-tale "The Wild Swans," the princess had to weave coats of nettles to break the spell on her brothers.

References

External links

 
Urticaceae genera
Leaf vegetables
Taxa named by Carl Linnaeus
Taxa described in 1753